Jules-Alexandre Grün (25 May 1868 – 15 February 1938) was a French post-impressionist painter, poster artist, and illustrator.

Grun's best known painting is called The Dinner Party, produced in 1911. It was, however, in the fields of poster art and illustration art, for which he was famous. He was employed at a large printing company in Paris and his artistic director was Jules Chéret. Chéret was also his main competitor in poster art.

References

External links
 The Forgotten Master
 The Posters of Grün
 The Story of How Grun Met Antoine Guillemet, his Mentor; wetcanvas.com

1868 births
1938 deaths
19th-century French painters
French male painters
20th-century French painters
20th-century French male artists
Post-impressionist painters
19th-century French male artists